The Greenbrier is a luxury resort located in the Allegheny Mountains near White Sulphur Springs in Greenbrier County, West Virginia, in the United States.

Since 1778, visitors have traveled to this part of the state to "take the waters" of the area.

The current Greenbrier was built in 1913 by the Chesapeake and Ohio Railway and was owned for much of its history by that company and its successors, Chessie System and CSX Corporation. Following years of heavy losses, CSX had the hotel file for bankruptcy protection in 2009. Justice Family Group, LLC, a company owned by coal baron and later Governor of West Virginia Jim Justice, subsequently bought the property and guaranteed all debts, resulting in dismissal of the bankruptcy protection. Justice promised to return the hotel to its former status as a five-star resort and to introduce "tasteful" gambling for guests to increase profit. The Greenbrier Hotel Corp. today operates as a subsidiary of Justice's company.

The last U.S. president to stay at The Greenbrier during a presidency was Dwight D. Eisenhower. A total of 28 presidents have stayed at the hotel.

The Greenbrier is also the site of a massive underground bunker that was meant to serve as an emergency shelter for the United States Congress during the Cold War. The bunker was code named "Project Greek Island".

History

Early development
A spring of sulphur water is at the center of the resort property. It is surrounded by the white-columned spring house, topped by a green dome that has been the symbol of The Greenbrier for generations. Beginning in 1778, Mrs. Anderson, a local pioneer, adopted the local Native American tradition of "taking the waters" to relieve her chronic rheumatism. Based on this resource, for the first 125 years, the resort was known by the name White Sulphur Springs. It was a destination for people during the summers who wanted to escape coastal heat and diseases.

The property was acquired by the Calwells, a prominent Baltimore family. They developed the large property as a resort, selling cottages, many of which still stand today, to prominent Southern individuals. Notable guests of the early 19th century included Martin Van Buren and Henry Clay.

In 1858, they built a huge hotel building on the property. The Grand Central Hotel came to be known by the moniker "The White" and, later, "The Old White". During the Civil War, the property changed hands between forces of the Confederate Army and the Union Army, who almost burned the resort to the ground.

Following the Civil War, the resort reopened. It became a place for many Southerners and Northerners alike to vacation. It was the setting for some notable post-war reconciliations. The "White Sulphur Manifesto", the only political paper published by Confederate General Robert E. Lee after the Civil War, advocated the merging of the two societies. The resort became a center of regional post-war society, especially after the arrival of the railroad. Beginning in 1869, it provided direct service to the resort's gates.

The Greenbrier
In 1910, the Chesapeake & Ohio Railway purchased the resort property, building additional amenities, including the current bath wing, which opened in 1911. The C&O's improvements culminated with the construction of a colossal six-story, 250-room hotel building, which forms the central wing of today's hotel. Designed by British-born American architect Frederick Julius Sterner, it opened on September 25, 1913. At this time, what had for decades been a summer establishment was converted to a year-round resort, and the name was officially changed to The Greenbrier, after the neighboring county. The neighboring town had incorporated in 1909 and adopted the name White Sulphur Springs, which the resort had previously used. The railroad also introduced the game of golf, which became a defining feature of the resort. The first small course was opened in 1910, and a full 18-hole course, designed by Charles B. Macdonald, opened at The Greenbrier in 1913. That original course is today known as "The Old White TPC". The historic Old White Hotel structure was demolished in 1922 because it failed to meet then-current fire codes. In 1931, completion of the north wing, crossing the original 1913 wing like a "T", nearly doubled the size of the hotel.

Just after the United States entered World War II, the resort was called on December 17, 1941, to serve as a relocation center for Axis diplomats who were in the United States and had been interned as enemies of the United States. The first detainees were Germans; later, they were joined by Japanese diplomats previously interned at The Homestead in Hot Springs, Virginia. The hotel served as a diplomatic detention center until July 8, 1942.

The hotel briefly reopened for the 1942 season, but was soon commandeered by the U.S. Army for use as a hospital. The Army paid $3.3 million for the property, which had been valued at $5.4 million, and took over control of the property on September 1, 1942. They converted the resort to a 2000-bed hospital, known as Ashford General Hospital, named for Bailey Ashford, a noted Army doctor. The hospital opened on October 16, 1943. The hospital treated nearly 25,000 patients before closing on June 30, 1946. The property was sold back to the C&O railroad for just under the $3.3 million they had been paid in 1942.

C&O hired internationally renowned interior designer Dorothy Draper to completely redecorate and restore The Greenbrier. Draper oversaw every element of the design of the property in her trademark style: combining bold colors, classical influences and modern touches, and the work took two years. The Greenbrier's reopening, celebrated from April 15 to April 18, 1948, was an international social event of the season. Notable attendees included the Duke of Windsor and his wife, Wallis Simpson (who had spent her honeymoon with her first husband at The Greenbrier in 1916), Bing Crosby, and members of the Joseph Kennedy family. Since the late 20th century, the resort has hosted several presidents and vice-presidents, in addition to foreign dignitaries such as Jawaharlal Nehru, Indira Gandhi, and Prince Rainier and Princess Grace of Monaco.

Hosts international meetings
The Greenbrier resort has played host to several important international meetings. During World War II, future Canadian prime minister Lester Pearson, then assigned to the Canadian embassy in Washington, D.C., was among the illustrious guests planning the Allied effort for resources allocation. The U.S., Mexican, and Canadian leaders met at the Greenbrier in 1955 for international discussions.

The Bunker

In the late 1950s, the U.S. government approached The Greenbrier for assistance in creating a secret emergency relocation center to house Congress in the aftermath of a nuclear holocaust. The classified, underground facility, named "Project Greek Island", was built at the same time as the West Virginia Wing, an above-ground addition to the hotel, from 1959 to 1962.

Although for 30 years the bunker was kept stocked with supplies, it was never used as an emergency location, even during the Cuban Missile Crisis. The existence of the bunker was not acknowledged by the government; Ted Gup of The Washington Post reported it in a 1992 story. Immediately after publication of the Post story, the government decommissioned the bunker. The facility has since been renovated. It is used as a data storage facility by CSX IP for the private sector. It is featured as an attraction in which visitors can tour the now declassified facilities, known as The Bunker.

Justice family ownership
On March 20, 2009, the resort filed for bankruptcy, listing debt of up to $500 million and assets of $100 million. It had suffered from competition from a wide variety of resorts, and declining traffic since the postwar period as patrons shifted to destinations they could reach by automobile. The resort lost $35 million in 2008 and had to lay off 650 employees, half its workforce, in early 2009. Pending court and regulatory approval, it was announced in March 2009 that the resort was to be sold to the Marriott hotel chain, contingent upon significant concessions from the unions and approval of $50 million in financing from CSX.

On May 7, 2009, the Justice family of West Virginia purchased the resort for $20 million. The Justice family, headed by patriarch Jim Justice, has extensive farm and mining operations in West Virginia, Virginia, North Carolina and South Carolina. It farms  through its Justice Family Farms group, headquartered in Beckley, West Virginia. In early 2009, it sold its Bluestone Coal Corporation network of West Virginia coal mines to Mechel.

The Marriott Corporation asserted that it had a valid contract to purchase the hotel, and expected to see that contract honored.  However, Justice ultimately settled with Marriott. The bankruptcy judge dismissed the case on May 19, 2009, clearing the way for Justice's purchase of the property.

The resort was closed briefly after the 2016 West Virginia flood; however, flood victims who needed a place to stay were offered rooms in the hotel. The hotel reopened on July 12, 2016, with several amenities, including an off-road Jeep trail, several walking trails, and the falconry operation, which had been closed for the year.

With Justice's election as Governor of West Virginia in 2017, his daughter Jill took over day-to-day control of The Greenbrier.

Facilities

The Casino Club at the Greenbrier 
In November 2008, county voters narrowly approved a local option referendum that would permit casino-style gambling at the hotel. The rules, regulations, and tax rates were signed into law on May 8, 2009. The Justice family promised that gambling facilities at the resort would be "tasteful" if established.
The temporary casino, named "The Tavern Casino", opened on October 1, 2009. The permanent casino, The Casino Club at The Greenbrier opened on July 2, 2010 with a celebrity gala.

Under the state's regulations, only "guests" of the Greenbrier may visit the casino. The hotel and state regulators have differed over the definition of "guest", as the casino allows persons taking a tour or dining at the resort to visit, without being registered to stay overnight in the hotel. In 2013, the casino added simulcast horse racing and associated betting to its offerings.

Presidents' Cottage Museum
Twenty-eight presidents have been hosted at The Greenbrier.  The Presidents' Cottage Museum is a two-story building with exhibits about these visits and the history of The Greenbrier.  The building is open seasonally.

Golf
The resort has a significant place in golf history. The original nine holes were designed by Alexander H. Findlay. In 1944, Sam Snead became the head golf professional at Greenbrier and in retirement held the position of the resort's pro emeritus. In the 21st century, that title has been held by Tom Watson and later Lee Trevino.

The Greenbrier was the site of the Ryder Cup in 1979, the first to be contested under the format of United States against Europe, which has been continued to the present. It hosted the Solheim Cup in 1994, the women's equivalent to the Ryder Cup. The Greenbrier is the first of three locations to host both the men's and women's United States versus Europe team competitions, the Ryder and Solheim cups; it was joined in 1998 by Muirfield Village in Dublin, Ohio, with Scotland's Gleneagles Hotel PGA Centenary Course, the host of the 2014 Ryder Cup, joining when it hosted the 2019 Solheim Cup.

The Greenbrier American Express Championship on the Senior PGA Tour (now the PGA Tour Champions) was held from 1985 through 1987.

The PGA Tour came to the hotel in 2010 with the Greenbrier Classic.  After two years of being held on the last weekend of July, the tournament obtained the more favorable date of the first weekend in July, starting in 2012. On March 28, 2011, The Old White Course became a TPC course. The 2016 event was canceled due to severe flooding in June.

All four of the golf courses on the property, the Old White TPC, the Greenbrier Course, the Meadows Course, and the Snead Course were damaged in the 2016 flood.  On July 12, 2016, a modified course, made up mostly of the Greenbrier Course but also parts of the Meadows Course, was laid out and opened for play that year. The remaining courses were closed for the year.

In 2020, the PGA Tour cancelled its TPC affiliation with The Greenbrier. The resort will host a LIV Golf event at the Old White Course in 2023.

Tennis
The resort is home to a 2,500-seat tennis stadium, five Har-Tru outdoor courts and five Deco-Turf indoor courts. As a result of the  COVID-19 pandemic, all matches during the 2020 World TeamTennis season were held at The Greenbrier.

Medical and sports facilities
The Greenbrier Clinic, adjacent to the hotel, has operated as an executive health facility since 1948.  In 1971 it began operating independently from the hotel (although still leasing its facility from The Greenbrier).

In 2011, Justice announced an ambitious plan to construct the Greenbrier Medical Institute, a large-scale medical facility with a projected cost of at least $250 million, planned to be built in five stages. It was to include a sports medicine facility to be headed by orthopedic surgeon James Andrews. Construction of the first stage began in May 2012.

The project was intended to establish relationships with professional sports teams, as the resort wanted to attract a National Football League team that would hold its annual training camp at The Greenbrier. In March 2014, the New Orleans Saints and the hotel reached agreement on a three-year deal.  The hotel committed to build three football fields and other facilities for the Saints, at an estimated cost of $20–25 million, adjacent to the medical facilities. The project was to be partially subsidized by tax breaks recently approved by the state legislature, with an estimated value of $25 million over 10 years.

The relationship between the hotel and the Saints reportedly developed after a visit by Saints head coach Sean Payton to the 2013 Greenbrier Classic golf tournament to play in its pro-am competition and then to serve as caddie for his friend, PGA Tour player Ryan Palmer.  After three seasons (during which the Saints praised the Greenbrier's facilities but finished with a 7–9 record every year), the Saints did not renew their contract with the hotel.  The Houston Texans took over the facilities for their 2017 training camp.

The Spring League, a minor league football organization which evolved into the USFL, held six of the seven games in their inaugural season at The Greenbrier.

In popular culture
Set in West Virginia in the aftermath of a nuclear war, the video game Fallout 76 features a location known as "The Whitespring Resort" which strongly resembles the exterior and interior of the Greenbrier, including the hidden government bunker beneath. 

Entombed, a 2010 novel by Brian Keene, takes place in a fictionalized West Virginia hotel with a bunker beneath. The author states in the afterword that he was inspired by the Greenbrier.

The Greenbrier was at the center of a moment on the U.S. game show Who Wants to Be a Millionaire. Comedian Norm Macdonald's $1,000,000 question was in reference to the Greenbrier's bunker. Macdonald was ready to correctly guess the Greenbrier but believed host Regis Philbin was trying to talk him out of the answer. Philbin did not know the answer, and was trying to ensure that Macdonald did not lose the $468,000 that he had already won for a charity. Macdonald walked away with $500,000 for Paul Newman's Hole in the Wall Camps.

The Greenbrier is used as a setting in the 1933 film Mary Stevens, M.D.

Gallery

See also
List of casinos in West Virginia 
List of casinos in the United States 
List of casino hotels
 Mount Weather Emergency Operations Center
 Raven Rock Mountain Complex
 Greenbrier Presidential Express, a train that was planned to run between Washington, D.C., and White Sulphur Springs

References

Sources
The History of The Greenbrier: America's Resort by Robert Conte

Bibliography
 Conte, Robert S. The History of the Greenbrier: America's Resort. Charleston, W. Va: Published for the Greenbrier by Pictorial Histories Pub. Co, 1989. http://www.worldcat.org/oclc/21426566
 Greenbrier (White Sulphur Springs, W. Va.). In America It's The Greenbrier: "Famous Since 1778", White Sulphur Springs West Virginia. [White Sulphur Springs, W. Va.]: [The Greenbrier], 1930. Signed, in print, L.R. Johnston, General Manager ... Possibly a proof copy. Printed as [12] p. on 2 sheets (45 x 58 cm. or smaller) with text on one side of sheet only. http://www.worldcat.org/oclc/63110504
 Greenbrier (White Sulphur Springs, W. Va.). The Greenbrier Historical Heritage: White Sulphur Springs, West Virginia : Where the Vacation Season Never Ends. [White Sulphur Springs, W. Va.]: [The Greenbrier], 1965. http://www.worldcat.org/oclc/76875121
 Greenbrier White Sulphur Springs Company. A Treatise on the White Sulphur Springs and Its Waters, 1892. [Richmond, Va.]: [A. Hoenx], 1892. http://www.worldcat.org/oclc/26019669
 Greenbrier Hotel, White Sulphur Springs, W. Va. General Robert E. Lee at White Sulphur Springs, 1867-'68-'69. [White Sulphur Springs, W. Va.]: [The Greenbrier], 1932. http://www.worldcat.org/oclc/6366418
 Greenbrier (White Sulphur Springs, W. Va.). The Portico. White Sulphur Springs, W. Va: The Greenbrier, 1932. "Published weekly, during the season. Sub-title: "Tales of the 'Old White' and Notes from the Greenbrier." Editor: Alice Elizabeth Gasaway, The Greenbrier ..." http://www.worldcat.org/oclc/47804280
 Greenbrier (White Sulphur Springs, W. Va.), and Chesapeake and Ohio Railway Company. Green-Brier White Sulphur Springs, 1900. [White Sulphur Springs, W. Va.]: [Greenbrier], 1900. Contains a description of the hotel (with rates), society and its amusements and scenery, with an analysis of the water, a Bird's eye view of the White Sulphur Springs, and information on Chesapeake and Ohio's train service to the area. http://www.worldcat.org/oclc/233974083
 Keefer, Louis E. Shangri-La for Wounded Soldiers: The Greenbrier As a World War II Army Hospital. Reston, VA: Cotu Pub, 1995. 
 MacCorkle, William Alexander. The White Sulphur Springs; The Traditions, History, and Social Life of the Greenbriar White Sulphur Springs. New York: The Neale Publishing Company, 1916. http://www.worldcat.org/oclc/1581713
 Miscellaneous Materials About Greenbrier, White Sulphur Springs, West Virginia. Includes Informational Brochures, Menus, Calendars, Postcards. 1940. Artist sees the Greenbrier; Roads and trails on the estate and in the vicinity of the Greenbrier, White Sulphur Springs, West Virginia; White Sulphur Springs, the Greenbrier and cottages; Greenbrier overture; Follow the Old Buffalo and Seneca trails to White Sulphur Springs, West Virginia; Baths and medical department of the Greenbrier, White Sulphur Springs, West Virginia; America's most beautiful all-year-resort, the Greenbrier and cottages; Greenbrier calendar; Robert E. Lee week; Old White arts school and colony; Old White Art Gallery; President's cottage, 1835-1932; White Sulphur for conventions. http://www.worldcat.org/oclc/647900978
 Moorman, J. J. Virginia White Sulphur Springs With the Analysis of Its Waters, the Diseases to Which They Are Applicable, and Some Account of Society and Its Amusements at the Springs. Baltimore: Kelly, Piet, 1869. http://www.worldcat.org/oclc/10845672
 Moorman, J. J. A Brief Notice of a Portion of a Work by William Burke, Entitled "The Mineral Springs of Western Virginia": With Preliminary Remarks on the Relative Virtues of the Saline and Gaseous Contents of the White Sulphur Water. Philadelphia: Printed by Merrihew and Thompson, 1843. http://www.worldcat.org/oclc/14828853
 Olcott, William. The Greenbrier Heritage. [Philadelphia?]: [Arndt, Preston, Chapin, Lamb & Keen], 1967. http://www.worldcat.org/oclc/564643
 Panel Descriptions of the Virginia Room. The Greenbrier, White Sulphur Springs, W. Va. [White Sulpher Springs, W. Va.]: [The Greenbrier], 1931. http://www.worldcat.org/oclc/47745488
 Pencil, Mark. White Sulphur Papers, or, Life at the Springs of Western Virginia. New York: S. Colman, 1839. http://www.worldcat.org/oclc/12415888
 Rains, David. The History of the White Sulphur Springs, West Virginia, Famous Since 1778, And The Greenbrier and Cottages. Roanoke, Va: Stone Print. and manufacturing Co, 1939. http://www.worldcat.org/oclc/5576726
 Smith, Wm. P. Topographical Map of a Portion of the White Sulphur Springs Tract in Greenbrier County, West Virginia. [United States]: [publisher not identified], 1875. http://www.worldcat.org/oclc/56966082
 Topographic Map of White Sulphur Springs, Greenbrier County, West Virginia. [White Sulphur Springs, W. Va.?]: [publisher not identified], 1970. http://www.worldcat.org/oclc/13946601

External links

Official site
The Bunker – official site
The Ultimate Congressional Hideaway – 1992 article exposing the bunker
Additional History of the Bunker
Interview with Paul Fritz Bugas, former superintendent of the bunker
Congressional Bunker Tour
Virtual Tour at the Civil Defense Museum
"The Greenbrier Resort Hopes to Preserve Its Past" – New York Times, 2010
"Taking the Waters: 19th Century Medicinal Springs: White Sulphur Springs." Claude Moore Health Sciences Library, University of Virginia

 
1858 establishments in Virginia
Biographical museums in West Virginia
Buildings and structures in Greenbrier County, West Virginia
Chesapeake and Ohio Railway
Continuity of government in the United States
Destination spas
Disaster preparedness in the United States
Federal architecture in West Virginia
Golf clubs and courses designed by Charles B. Macdonald
Golf clubs and courses in West Virginia
Greenbrier County, West Virginia in the American Civil War
Historic districts on the National Register of Historic Places in West Virginia
Hotel buildings completed in 1913
Hotel buildings on the National Register of Historic Places in West Virginia
Hotels established in 1858
Hotels in West Virginia
Military and war museums in West Virginia
Military hospitals in the United States
Museums in Greenbrier County, West Virginia
National Historic Landmarks in West Virginia
National Register of Historic Places in Greenbrier County, West Virginia
Neoclassical architecture in West Virginia
Presidential museums in the United States
Railway hotels in the United States
Resorts in West Virginia
Ryder Cup venues
Solheim Cup venues
Tourist attractions in Greenbrier County, West Virginia
White Sulphur Springs, West Virginia